The Vernon County Courthouse in Viroqua, Wisconsin was built in 1880.  It was listed on the National Register of Historic Places in 1980.

It was designed in High Victorian Gothic style by Norwegian immigrant architect Carl F. Struck.  It is a two-story limestone building with three-story tower and belfry.

Murals inside include a scene of settlers arriving in wild Vernon County, painted by Leighton Oyen of LaCrosse.

The listing included a second contributing building, a sheriff's office and jail building with a red clay tiled hipped roof, built c.1910.

References

Courthouses in Wisconsin
National Register of Historic Places in Vernon County, Wisconsin
Gothic Revival architecture in Wisconsin
Government buildings completed in 1880